Lieutenant David Michael Mountbatten, 3rd Marquess of Milford Haven,  (12 May 1919 – 14 April 1970), styled Viscount Alderney before 1921 and Earl of Medina between 1921 and 1938, was the son of the George Mountbatten, 2nd Marquess of Milford Haven and Countess Nadejda Mikhailovna of Torby.

Biography

Early years and education
Lord Milford Haven was born in 1919. He was the only son of George Mountbatten, 2nd Marquess of Milford Haven (who had been born as Prince George of Battenberg), and Russian Countess Nadejda (Nada) Torby, who wed in 1916. His paternal grandparents were Prince Louis of Battenberg and Princess Victoria of Hesse and by Rhine. Therefore, he was a great-great-grandson of Queen Victoria. His maternal grandparents were Grand Duke Michael Mikhailovich of Russia and Countess Sophie von Merenberg. He is also a descendant of the Russian writer Aleksandr Pushkin as well as Peter the Great's African protégé, General Abram Petrovich Gannibal.

He grew up at the family home in Holyport, Berkshire and enjoyed a close friendship with his first cousin Prince Philip of Greece and Denmark, later the Duke of Edinburgh. They both attended Dartmouth Naval College. He served as best man to the prince at his marriage in November 1947 to the Princess Elizabeth, later Queen Elizabeth II.

Upon the death of his father on 8 April 1938, he became the 3rd Marquess of Milford Haven and head of the House of Mountbatten.

Navy and postwar social life
During the Second World War Milford Haven served in the Royal Navy. In 1942 he was appointed an Officer of the Order of the British Empire for taking the destroyer Kandahar through a minefield in an attempt to rescue the cruiser Neptune. In 1943 he was awarded the Distinguished Service Cross for his work on Malta convoy operations. He retired from the Navy in 1948. He subsequently joined The Castaways' Club, which enabled him to keep in close contact with many of his naval contemporaries.

He then played a prominent part in the London demi-monde of the 1950s, which brought together a colourful mix of aristocrats and shadowy social climbers like osteopath Stephen Ward. This hard-partying set formed the nucleus for the Profumo affair.

Marriages
Milford Haven was married twice:
 1) Romaine Dahlgren Pierce (17 July 1923 – 15 February 1975), daughter of Vinton Ulric Dahlgren Pierce, of Washington, D.C., and his wife, Margaret Knickerbocker Clark, on 4 February 1950 in Washington, D.C.; she was formerly married on 23 May 1946 to William Simpson, son of a millionaire Chicago department store owner (by whom she had a daughter) and they were divorced in 1954 in Mexico. She married, thirdly, to James B. Orthwein. Romaine was the great-granddaughter of the Admiral John A. Dahlgren and the writer Madeleine Vinton Dahlgren. They had no issue.
 2) Janet Mercedes Bryce (born Bermuda, 29 September 1937), daughter of Major Francis (Frank) Bryce and Gladys Jean Mosley (whose aunt, Mary Mercedes Bryce, married Colonel Joseph Harold John Phillips, the grandparents of Alexandra Hamilton, Duchess of Abercorn and Natalia Grosvenor, Duchess of Westminster) on 17 November 1960 at St Andrew's Presbyterian Church, Frognal, London. They had two children:
 George Mountbatten, 4th Marquess of Milford Haven (born 6 June 1961)
 Lord Ivar Mountbatten (born 9 March 1963)

Death
Milford Haven died of a heart attack, aged 50, on 14 April 1970 in London. His ashes were buried in the Battenberg Chapel at St. Mildred's Church, Whippingham, on the Isle of Wight (photo).

Arms

References

External links
 

Milford Haven, David Michael Mountbatten, 3rd Marquess of
Milford Haven, David Michael Mountbatten, 3rd Marquess of
Milford Haven, David Michael Mountbatten, 3rd Marquess of
British people of German descent
British people of Russian descent
David Mountbatten, 3rd Marquess of Milford Haven
Royal Navy officers of World War II
Officers of the Order of the British Empire
Recipients of the Distinguished Service Cross (United Kingdom)
Burials at St. Mildred's Church, Whippingham
Marquesses of Milford Haven